Dunvegan Castle (Caisteal Dhùn Bheagain) is located  to the north of Dunvegan on the Isle of Skye, off the west coast of Scotland. It is the seat of the MacLeod of MacLeod, chief of the Clan MacLeod. Probably a fortified site from the earliest times, the castle was first built in the 13th century and developed piecemeal over the centuries. In the 19th century the whole castle was remodelled in a mock-medieval style. The castle is built on an elevated rock overlooking an inlet on the eastern shore of Loch Dunvegan, a sea loch.

History
The promontory was enclosed by a curtain wall in the 13th century, and a four-storey tower house was built in the late 14th century. This tower was similar in style to contemporary structures at Kisimul Castle and Caisteal Maol. Alasdair Crotach, the 8th chief, added the Fairy Tower as a separate building around 1500. During the 17th century, new ranges of buildings were put up between the old tower and the Fairy Tower, beginning in 1623 with the state apartment built by Ruairidh Mòr. The old tower was subsequently abandoned until the late 18th century, when the 23rd chief began the process of homogenising the appearance of the castle. This process continued under the 24th and 25th chiefs, with the addition of mock battlements and the new approach over a drawbridge from the east. The present appearance of the castle dates from around 1840 when this process of "baronialisation" was completed. The castle is a Category A listed building.

Site

Artifacts
Notable family heirlooms kept at Dunvegan Castle include:
Dunvegan Cup
Fairy Flag
Sir Rory Mor's Horn

Images

References

External links

Dunvegan Castle's homepage
Dunvegan Castle, Isle of Skye, Clan Macleod Scotland

Castles in the Isle of Skye
Clan Macleod
Inventory of Gardens and Designed Landscapes
Category A listed buildings in Highland (council area)
Listed castles in Scotland
Gardens in Highland (council area)
Historic house museums in Highland (council area)
Country houses in Highland (council area)